TACA Flight 110 was an international scheduled airline flight operated by TACA International, traveling from Belize City to New Orleans. On May 24, 1988, the flight encountered severe thunderstorm activity on its final approach to its destination. As a result, the brand new Boeing 737-300 suffered flameout in both engines while descending through a severe thunderstorm, but the pilots made a successful emergency landing on a grass levee adjacent to NASA's Michoud Assembly Facility, with no one aboard sustaining more than a few minor injuries, and with only minor hail damage to the intact aircraft. Following an on-site engine replacement, the jetliner took off from Saturn Boulevard, a road which had previously been an aircraft runway at Michoud. The aircraft was subsequently repaired and returned to service until it finally retired in 2016.

Flight history
The aircraft, a Boeing 737-3T0 (tail number N75356, serial number 23838, the 1,505th Boeing 737 manufactured), had first flown on January 26, 1988. The airliner had been in service with TACA for about two weeks after it was acquired from Polaris Aircraft Leasing in May 1988.

The captain of the flight was Carlos Dardano. At 29 years of age, Dardano had amassed 13,410 flight hours, with almost 11,000 of these as pilot in command. Earlier in his career, he had lost an eye to crossfire on a short flight to El Salvador, where civil war was raging at the time. The first officer, Dionisio Lopez (48), was also very experienced, with more than 12,000 flight hours logged. Captain Arturo Soley, an instructor pilot, was also in the cockpit, monitoring the performance of the new 737.

The flight proceeded normally. It took off from Belize City's Philip S. W. Goldson International Airport and flew over the Gulf of Mexico toward the Louisiana coast.

Incident

Investigation by the National Transportation Safety Board (NTSB) revealed that as the Boeing 737-3T0 aircraft was in descent mode from FL 350 (about ) on final approach to its destination in preparation for their impending arrival at New Orleans International Airport, the pilots noticed substantial thunderstorm activity visible ahead and on their onboard weather radar and noticed areas of light to moderate precipitation in their path, depicted as green and yellow areas, as well as "some isolated red cells" indicative of heavy precipitation to both sides of their intended flight path. They attempted to fly in between two intense red weather cells visible on their radar.

The flight entered overcast clouds at FL 300 (about ), with the pilots selecting "continuous ignition" and turning on engine anti-ice as a precaution to protect their turbofan engines from the effects of precipitation and icing, either of which is capable of causing a flameout, where the engines lose all power. Despite flying a route between the two areas of heavy precipitation shown on radar, they entered an intense thunderstorm and encountered heavy torrential rain, hail, and turbulence.

A few minutes later, as the aircraft was descending through , both CFM International CFM56 turbofan engines experienced a flameout, which resulted in the loss of all generated electrical power, leaving the jet gliding powerlessly with neither engine producing thrust or electrical power. Both engines' thrust levers were set at their flight-idle power setting in preparation for landing just before the flameout occurred. The auxiliary power unit (APU) was started as the plane descended through , restoring electrical power and hydraulics.

While attempts to "windmill re-start" the engines using the airflow generated by the plane's descent were unsuccessful, the pilots were eventually able to reignite them by following the standard restart procedure, using the main engine starters, which were powered by the APU. However, shortly after being restarted, neither engine produced more than idle power and did not spool up to a point where it was producing meaningful thrust, much less high thrust. Attempts to advance the throttles only resulted in overheating of the engines, so the pilots shut down both engines to avoid a catastrophic engine fire. First Officer Lopez transmitted a Mayday call over the radio, but despite the New Orleans air traffic controllers' assistance by offering vectors to a closer airport at Lakefront, it was too far.

At this point, realizing that reigniting both damaged, malfunctioning engines was futile, the pilots scouted the area and contemplated their options for a crash-landing on the swampy wetland, as no runway was reachable with the remaining altitude and airspeed. As the aircraft descended through the lower layer of storm clouds, the pilots initially decided to ditch in the Gulf Intracoastal Waterway with the flaps and gear retracted. Captain Dardano lined up with the canal in an industrial area east of the airport and stretched the glide, to try to have it glide the longest possible distance without stalling while First Officer Lopez went through the ditching checklist, and configured the aircraft for a water landing.

Lopez spotted a grass levee to the right of the canal, and suggested that the emergency landing be attempted there. Dardano agreed, and carried out an emergency landing of the crippled plane onto the narrow grass levee on the grounds of the NASA Michoud Assembly Facility (MAF) in eastern New Orleans, near the Intracoastal Waterway's confluence with the Mississippi River Gulf Outlet.

Investigation and aftermath

NTSB investigators determined that the aircraft had inadvertently flown into a level 4 thunderstorm and that water ingestion had caused both engines to flame out, during descent with lower engine RPM, despite them being certified to meeting Federal Aviation Administration (FAA) standards for water ingestion. The aircraft suffered mild hail damage, and its right-side (number 2) engine was damaged from overheating.

To avoid similar problems in the future, the engine manufacturer, CFM International, modified the CFM56 engine by adding a sensor to force the combustor to continuously ignite under heavy rain or hail conditions. Other modifications were made to the engine nose cone and the spacing of the fan blades to better deflect hail away from the engine core. Also, additional bleed doors were added to drain more water from the engine.

Return to service

Initially, it was planned to remove the wings and transport the airplane to a repair facility by barge, but Boeing engineers and test pilots decided to perform an engine change on site.  The aircraft was towed from the levee to the nearby NASA facility, fueled to the minimum amount needed and departed from Saturn Boulevard, a roadway built atop the original World War II-era runway.  Following takeoff, the 737 flew to Moisant Field, where further maintenance work was performed.

After its return to service, the plane was flown by TACA until March 1989 when it was acquired by Aviateca. The aircraft was then acquired by America West Airlines as N319AW in April 1991, then later Morris Air in January 1993. The aircraft was eventually acquired by Southwest Airlines in January 1995 first as N764MA then registered to N697SW in March 1995. It continued service for Southwest until December 2, 2016, when it was retired and placed into storage at Pinal Airpark.

Media 
It was featured in an episode of the TV show Mayday with the title "Nowhere to Land"; the episode is from season 11, episode 11.

See also
 CFM56 engine issues in rain and hail
 List of airline flights that required gliding
 Garuda Indonesia Flight 421 – Similar incident with same aircraft type, dual engine flameout when passing through thunderstorm

References

External links

NTSB Final Report March 25, 1991.
NTSB Synopsis
accident overview - Federal Aviation Administration
Full NTSB accident file

Description of the NASA Michoud Facility and Air Traffic Controller's account of the event

Airliner accidents and incidents in Louisiana
Airliner accidents and incidents caused by weather
Aviation accidents and incidents in the United States in 1988
Airliner accidents and incidents caused by engine failure
Disasters in Louisiana
Accidents and incidents involving the Boeing 737 Classic
Avianca El Salvador accidents and incidents
20th century in New Orleans
1988 in Louisiana
1988 meteorology
May 1988 events in the United States